Ashraf Barhom (born January 8, 1979) is an Palestinian Arab actor from Tarshiha, in Galilee, Israel. He has starred in The Kingdom, Paradise Now, By Any Means and The Syrian Bride.

Early life 
Barhom grew up in an Arab Christian family in the Galilee region in israel , in a small village called Ma'alot-Tarshiha. He participated in many school plays before attending the University of Haifa, where he graduated with a B.A. in Theatre and Arts. He has three sisters.  Of his ethnic heritage, Barhom has said:
When we attach ourselves to national identities, then we enter into a cycle of conflict. I didn't choose where I was born or who to be or what people would call me. I'm a hybrid, from a cultural perspective, but I don't think in these terms. I'm more simple than that. I'm a mammal who will live 70 years more or less, who believes in God and likes his life.

Career 
In 2007, he garnered much attention for appearing alongside Jamie Foxx in the movie The Kingdom as Col. Faris Al-Ghazi. He has since appeared in such Israeli films as  Ahava Colombianit (Colombian Love) and Lebanon. He is also notable for starring in Agora, portraying the 5th century AD Alexandrian parabalani monk Ammonius, in the 2010 remake of Clash of the Titans as the bounty hunter Ozal, and in Ralph Fiennes' 2011 adaptation of Shakespeare's Coriolanus.
In July 2013 it was announced that Barhom had been cast in FX's series Tyrant.

Filmography

Film

Television

References

External links 
 

1979 births
Arab citizens of Israel
Israeli male film actors
Living people
University of Haifa alumni
Israeli Arab Christians
People from Northern District (Israel)